Brendan O'Connor may refer to:

 Brendan O'Connor (media personality) (born 1970), Irish comedian, columnist, and media personality
 Brendan O'Connor (politician) (born 1962), Australian politician and federal government minister
 Brendan O'Connor (soldier), Special Forces medical sergeant

See also
 Brendan Connor, Canadian sports journalist
 Brendon O'Connor, New Zealand rugby union footballer